The House at 18 Park Street, also known as the Clarence A. Van Derveer House, is a historic house at 18 Park Street in Wakefield, Massachusetts.  The -story Craftsman/Bungalow style house was built in 1922 by Clarence A Van Derveer, a real estate broker who lived next door and subdivided his lot to build this house.  It has classic Craftsman features, including exposed rafters under extended eaves (which shelter a porch), and paneled porch pillars and rails.

The house was listed on the National Register of Historic Places in 1989.

See also
National Register of Historic Places listings in Wakefield, Massachusetts
National Register of Historic Places listings in Middlesex County, Massachusetts

References

Houses on the National Register of Historic Places in Wakefield, Massachusetts
Houses completed in 1922
Houses in Wakefield, Massachusetts